The Director, Operational Test and Evaluation (DOT&E) is the principal staff assistant and adviser to the US Secretary of Defense on operational and live fire test and evaluation activities involving U.S. Department of Defense weapons systems.

Responsibilities
The director reports directly to the Secretary and Deputy Secretary of Defense, with the following responsibilities:
 Development and dissemination of Department of Defense operational test and evaluation policy and procedures
 Review and analysis of operational test and evaluation  results for Department of Defense acquisition programs
 Independent assessments of operational test and evaluation activities as it pertains to budgetary and financial issues for the Secretary of Defense, the Department of Defense, and the United States Congress
 Oversight to ensure the adequacy of operational test and evaluation for major Department of Defense acquisition programs and to confirm the operational effectiveness and suitability of the defense systems in combat use

History
The director's position was established September 24, 1983, by the Department of Defense Authorization Act of Fiscal Year 1984 (P.L. 98–94), and by Defense Directive 5141.2 of April 2, 1984.

Organization

The Operational Test and Evaluation Directorate of the Office of the Secretary of Defense is organized as follows:

 Air Warfare Joint Test and Evaluation
 Land and Expeditionary Warfare / Integrated Resource Analysis Team/Test and Evaluation Threat Resource Activity (IRAT/TETRA)
 Live Fire Test and Evaluation
 Naval Warfare
 Net Centric and Space Systems

The Director of Operational Test and Evaluation also maintains liaison with the Joint Chiefs of Staff J6 Joint Deployable Analysis Team.

Directors

See also
 Joint Interoperability Test Command
 Office of Naval Research
 Operational Test and Evaluation Force  - U.S. Navy
 Air Force Operational Test and Evaluation Center
 United States Army Test and Evaluation Command
 Marine Corps Operational Test and Evaluation Activity
 United States Naval Research Laboratory
 Joint Deployable Analysis Team

References

External links
 
 Statement by The Honorable Philip E. Coyle, Director, Operational Test & Evaluation (DOT&E), before the AirLand Subcommittee of the United States Senate Armed Services Committee – Russell Senate Office Building, Room 232A – March 25, 1998

United States Department of Defense agencies